Maura is a village in the municipality of Nannestad, Norway. It is located a few miles north of Oslo Airport. Its population (2020) is 4.224.

References

Villages in Akershus